Blighty is a small town in the Riverina region of New South Wales, Australia. The town lies on the Riverina Highway between the towns of Finley and Deniliquin. It is located in the Edward River Council local government area.

Blighty Post Office opened on 16 February 1926 and closed in 1932. It reopened in 1956 and closed again in 1991.

Blighty consists of a Hotel, school and an Australian rules football ground. The town has a team competing in the Picola & District Football League.

The land around Blighty is mainly irrigated and used to produce rice and other grains. Blighty is also a major receival centre for the Ricegrowers Co-Operative Limited with a number of sheds capable of storing  of grain.

See also
 Blighty Football Club

External links

Edward River Council - Official Website.

References

Towns in the Riverina
Towns in New South Wales